Jornal Nacional may refer to:

 Jornal Nacional (Angola), an Angolan national newscast on TPA
 Jornal Nacional, a Brazilian national newscast on Rede Globo
 Jornal Nacional (Portugal), a Portuguese national newscast on TVI